Labidiosticta is a monotypic genus of damselflies belonging to the family Isostictidae.
The single species of this genus, Labidiosticta vallisi,
commonly known as a large wiretail, 
is endemic to eastern Australia, where it inhabits streams and rivers.

Labidiosticta vallisi is a large dragonfly, that is a dull, dark bronze in colour.

Gallery

References

Isostictidae
Zygoptera genera
Monotypic Odonata genera
Odonata of Australia
Endemic fauna of Australia
Taxa named by J.A.L. (Tony) Watson
Insects described in 1991
Damselflies